DNA (cytosine-5)-methyltransferase 3A is an enzyme that catalyzes the transfer of methyl groups to specific CpG structures in DNA, a process called DNA methylation.  The enzyme is encoded in humans by the DNMT3A gene.

This enzyme is responsible for de novo DNA methylation. Such function is to be distinguished from maintenance DNA methylation which ensures the fidelity of replication of inherited epigenetic patterns. DNMT3A forms part of the family of DNA methyltransferase enzymes, which consists of the protagonists DNMT1, DNMT3A and DNMT3B.

While de novo DNA methylation modifies the information passed on by the parent to the progeny, it enables key epigenetic modifications essential for processes such as cellular differentiation and embryonic development, transcriptional regulation, heterochromatin formation, X-inactivation, imprinting and genome stability.

DNMT3a is the gene most commonly found mutated in clonal hematopoiesis, a common aging-related phenomenon in which hematopoietic stem cells (HSCs) or other early blood cell progenitors contribute to the formation of a genetically distinct subpopulation of blood cells.

Gene 

DNMT3A is a 130 kDa protein encoded by 23 exons found on chromosome 2p23 in humans.  There exists a 98% homology between human and murine homologues.

Due to splicing, there exist two main murine RNA isoforms, Dnmt3a1 and Dnmt3a2. These isoforms exist in different cell types.

Protein structure 

DNMT3A consists of three major protein domains: the Pro-Trp-Trp-Pro (PWWP) domain, the ATRX-DNMT3-DNMT3L (ADD) domain and the catalytic methyltransferase domain. The ADD domain serves as an inhibitor of the methyltransferase domain until DNMT3A binds to the unmodified lysine 4 of histone 3 (H3K4me0) for its de novo methylating activity. This protein thus seems to have an inbuilt control mechanism targeting histones only for methylation. Finally, the methyltransferase domain is highly conserved, even among prokaryotes.

Function 

DNMT1 is responsible for maintenance DNA methylation while DNMT3A and DNMT3B carry out both maintenance – correcting the errors of DNMT1 – and de novo DNA methylation. After DNMT1 knockout in human cancer cells, these cells were found to retain their inherited methylation pattern, which suggests maintenance activity by the expressed DNMT3s. DNMT3s show equal affinity for unmethylated and hemimethylated DNA substrates while DNMT1 has a 10-40 fold preference for hemimethylated DNA.  The DNMT3s can bind to both forms and hence potentially do both maintenance and de novo modifications.

De novo methylation is the main recognized activity of DNMT3A, which is essential for processes such as those mentioned in the introductory paragraphs. Genetic imprinting prevents parthenogenesis in mammals, and hence forces sexual reproduction and its multiple consequences on genetics and phylogenesis. DNMT3A is essential for genetic imprinting.

Animal studies 

In mice, this gene has shown reduced expression in ageing animals causes cognitive long-term memory decline.

In Dnmt3a-/- mice, many genes associated with HSC self-renewal increase in expression and some fail to be appropriately repressed during differentiation. This suggests abrogation of differentiation in hematopoietic stem cells (HSCs) and an increase in self-renewal cell-division instead. Indeed, it was found that differentiation was partially rescued if Dnmt3a-/- HSCs experienced an additional Ctnb1 knockdown – Ctnb1 codes for β-catenin, which participates in self-renewal cell division.

Clinical relevance 

This gene is frequently mutated in cancer, being one of 127 frequently mutated genes identified in the Cancer Genome Atlas project DNMT3A mutations were most commonly seen in acute myeloid leukaemia (AML) where they occurred in just over 25% of cases sequenced. These mutations most often occur at position R882 in the protein and this mutation may cause loss of function. DNMT3A mutations are associated with poor overall survival, suggesting that they have an important common effect on the potential of AML cells to cause lethal disease. It has also been found that DNMT3A-mutated cell lines exhibit transcriptome instability, in that they have much more erroneous RNA splicing as compared to their isogenic wildtype counterparts. Mutations in this gene are also associated with Tatton-Brown-Rahman syndrome, an over growth disorder.

Interactions 

DNMT3A has been shown to interact with:

 DNMT1, 
 DNMT3B, 
 HDAC1, 
 Myc, 
 PIAS1, 
 PIAS2, 
 SUV39H1,
 UBE2I and
 ZNF238.

Model organisms 

Model organisms have been used in the study of DNMT3A function. A conditional knockout mouse line called Dnmt3atm1a(KOMP)Wtsi was generated at the Wellcome Trust Sanger Institute. Male and female animals underwent a standardized phenotypic screen to determine the effects of deletion. Additional screens performed: - In-depth immunological phenotyping

References

Further reading